St. John's Episcopal Church was founded in 1804 by James Kilbourne, the same Episcopal deacon who founded the city in which the church resides, Worthington, Ohio, and for whom a nearby high school (Worthington Kilbourne High School) and middle school (Kilbourne Middle School) are named. It was the first Episcopal church built west of the Allegheny Mountains, built between 1827 and 1831, with Kilbourne Hall (the parish house) constructed in 1927 and the church's Early Education Center in 1962.

St. John's is among the 80 member congregations comprising the Episcopal Diocese of Southern Ohio.

In addition to the church itself, the Township Hall and graveyard behind the church were all inducted to the National Register of Historic Places on April 17, 1980.
The cemetery behind the church contains at least 317 burials from the community from between 1804 and 1882.

References

External links 
St. John’s Episcopal Church: History 
Worthington Historical Society's National Register of Historic Places: Thirty Worthington Sites 
Diocese of Southern Ohio

Churches on the National Register of Historic Places in Ohio
Episcopal churches in Ohio
Churches completed in 1831
Churches in Franklin County, Ohio
19th-century Episcopal church buildings
National Register of Historic Places in Franklin County, Ohio
Religious organizations established in 1804
High Street (Columbus, Ohio)